The Night Watch (French: La ronde de nuit) is a 1925 French drama film directed by Marcel Silver and starring Suzanne Bianchetti, Vladimir Gajdarov and Raquel Meller.

The film's sets were designed by the art director Robert Mallet-Stevens.

Plot summary

Cast
In alphabetical order
 Jacques Arnna as Duc Procope 
 Léon Bary as Stello 
 Suzanne Bianchetti as Princesse Hedwig 
 Albert Bras as Baron Tobel 
 Gilbert Dalleu as Wolfgang 
 Vladimir Gajdarov as Prince Laszlo
 Raquel Meller as Princesse Stefania 
 Marie-Louise Vois as Duchesse de Windischgrätz

References

Bibliography
 David Henry Slavin. Colonial Cinema and Imperial France, 1919–1939: White Blind Spots, Male Fantasies, Settler Myths. JHU Press, 2001.

External links
 
 

1925 films
Films directed by Marcel Silver
French silent films
French black-and-white films
French drama films
Silent drama films
1920s French films